Vangelis Panakis (8 June 1933 – 23 January 2017) was a Greek professional footballer who played as a forward for Panathinaikos and a later manager. His real name was Panopoulos. He played in 14 matches for the Greece national football team from 1954 to 1962. He was also part of Greece's team for their qualification matches for the 1954 FIFA World Cup.

Honours

Panathinaikos
Alpha Ethniki: 1952–53, 1959–60, 1960–61, 1961–62, 1963–64, 1964–65
Greek Cup: 1954–55
Athens FCA Championship: 1951–52, 1952–53, 1953–54, 1954–55, 1955–56, 1956–57, 1958–59

See also
List of one-club men in association football

References

External links

1933 births
2017 deaths
Greek footballers
Greece international footballers
Panathinaikos F.C. players
Place of birth missing
Association football forwards